Konijerla is a village in Lingapallem Mandal of West Godavari District in Andhra Pradesh. The village is on the banks of Tammileru. The nearest train station is located Eluru.

Demographics 

 Census of India, Konijerla had a population of 980. The total population constitutes 489 males and 491 females with a sex ratio of 1004 females per 1000 males. 86 children are in the age group of 0–6 years, with sex ratio of 1457. The average literacy rate stands at 73.15%.

References

Villages in West Godavari district